Gerontia is a genus of small air-breathing land snails, terrestrial gastropod mollusks in the family Charopidae.

Species
Species within the genus Gerontia include:
 Gerontia pantherina, Hutton, 1882

References

 Bruce A. Marshall, Molluscan and brachiopod taxa introduced by F. W. Hutton in The New Zealand journal of science; Journal of the Royal Society of New Zealand, Volume 25, Issue 4, 1995

Charopidae